Ibidunni Ighodalo (July 1980 – 14 June 2020) was a beauty queen, an event management expert, a philanthropist, and a co-pastor of Trinity House Church, in Lagos, Nigeria. She is the founder of Elizabeth R, a public relations and event company; and Ibidunni Ighodalo Foundation, a non-profit organization that is focused on supporting families with infertility challenges.

Biography
Ibidunni Ighodalo was born in Kaduna, Kaduna State on 19 July 1980. She is the fifth child of eight children of Olaleye Ajayi.

Ighodalo attended K-Kotun Primary School in Surulere, Lagos and did her Secondary School at Federal Government Girls College, Oyo State. Afterwards, she applied to study Medicine at the University of Lagos, Akoka, which was her father's choice. However, her admission paper got mixed up with someone else, and she decided to study Microbiology. Upon the completion of her Bachelor degree, she acquired further training in Business Management from the Lagos Business School. She was also a fellow of the National Institute Marketing.

In 1998, before she started University, her brothers registered her for a beauty competition, the Miss Lux beauty Pageant, and in 1999 she was the first-ever winner of the Miss Lux Beauty Pageant. This created pathways to her career in event management. In 2003, she established her event management and public relation company, known as Elizabeth R, and three years later, she started a bridal store, Avant-Garde.

In 2007, she married Pastor Ituah Ighodalo of Trinity House Church and both have two adopted children. Ighodalo was open about her own struggles to conceive, and her passion to help families that are suffering from infertility. She once narrated in an interview how they struggled to have their own children, visited hospitals and were told by medical doctors that their only option is to seek treatment through assisted reproduction. Ighodalo said that she had done IVF 11 times and it failed every time, and during the last attempt, she was pregnant with twins. She lost the pregnancy after three months. These experiences led her to establish Ibidunni Ighodalo Foundation to create awareness on infertility and provide financial supports for families with such issues to do IVF.  Through the foundation, she has provided grants for couples to undergo IVF, and carried out awareness.

Ighodalo died in the early hours of Sunday morning, 14 June 2020 in Port Harcourt, in Southern Nigeria. Before her death, she was on assignment to set up a COVID-19 isolation centre for the River State government. Ighodalo died about a month before her 40th birthday. She died due to cardiac arrest.

References

1980 births
2020 deaths
Nigerian women business executives
Yoruba beauty pageant contestants
Yoruba Christian clergy
University of Lagos alumni
Event planners
Women Christian clergy
Lagos Business School alumni
Nigerian beauty pageant winners
Nigerian Christian clergy
Yoruba women in business
Nigerian philanthropists
Yoruba women philanthropists